Ulrichsberg is a municipality in the district of Rohrbach in the Austrian state of Upper Austria.

Geography
Ulrichsberg lies in Mühlviertel in Upper Austria near the Bohemian Forest and along the Große Mühl river (north of the Danube). It covers an area of 12.2 km north to south and 10.3 km east to west for a total area of 57 km2. 51.8% of the area is forested and 44.7% of the area is in agricultural use. 

Nearby Gemeinden (municipalities) are:
Berdetschlag, Breitenstein, Dietrichschlag, Erlet, Fuchslug, Hintenberg, Kandlschlag, Lichtenberg, Mühlwald, Ödenkirchen, Salnau, Schindlau, Seitelschlag, Sonnenwald, Stangl, Stollnberg, Ulrichsberg, and Zaglau. North of Lichtenberg, in Schöneben, is a small border crossing to the Czech Republic.

History
Ulrichsberg was first mentioned in a document in 1325.

References

Cities and towns in Rohrbach District